is a Japanese actor who won the best new actor award in the 32nd Takasaki film festival in 2018 for his role in the comedy drama, Poetry Angel (2017). He is represented by the talent agency, Humanité. He was born in Tokyo.

Biography
Okayama debuted in 2009. His acting debut was in the drama, Chūgakusei Nikki Tenkōsei Series (1): Shōnen wa Ten no Oto o Kiku.

Okayama made many successes in films and television series in 2011. He appeared in the films Inu to Anata no Monogatari Inu no Ei ga, Usotsuki Mii-kun to Kowareta Maa-chan, and the Fuji TV drama, Taisetsunakoto wa Subete Kimi ga Oshiete Kureta.

Okayama's specialty is painting and hobby is dancing.

Filmography

TV series

Films

References

External links
Official profile 

21st-century Japanese male actors
1994 births
Living people
People from Tokyo